Rear admiral Wilfred Geoffrey Brittain CBE CB (19 June 1903 – 1979) was a Royal Navy officer who became Flag Officer, Malta.

Naval career
Brittain joined the Royal Navy in January 1917 during World War I. He also served in World War II becoming commanding officer of the cruiser HMS Royalist in December 1944. After the War he became Director of Navigation at the Admiralty in December 1949, Captain of the Fleet, Home Fleet in April 1952 and Flag Officer, Malta in August 1954.

References

1903 births
1979 deaths
Royal Navy rear admirals
Commanders of the Order of the British Empire
Companions of the Order of the Bath